Ustinova is a Russian surname (the feminine form of Ustinov) that can refer to the following:

 Anna Ustinova, Kazakh high jumper
 Anna Ustinova, Russian mountain bike orienteer
 Daria Ustinova, Russian backstroke swimmer
 Natalya Ustinova, Uzbek former swimmer
 Svetlana Ustinova,  Russian actress
 Tatyana Ustinova, Soviet geologist

Russian-language surnames